This is a list of all songs performed by the British pop girl group Stooshe.

Original songs

See also

 Stooshe
 Stooshe discography

 
Stooshe
Stooshe